Niwka may refer to the following places:
Niwka, Tarnów County in Lesser Poland Voivodeship (south Poland)
Niwka, Drawsko County in West Pomeranian Voivodeship (north-west Poland)
Niwka, Gryfino County in West Pomeranian Voivodeship (north-west Poland)
Niwka, Kamień County in West Pomeranian Voivodeship (north-west Poland)
Niwka, Sosnowiec, a district of Sosnowiec (south Poland)